Grand Duchess (also known as Duchess de Luynes) is a solitaire card game which is played with two decks of playing cards. It is a two deck game in the  Sir Tommy family.  One unique feature of this game is the building of the reserve, which is not used until the entire stock runs out.

Rules
First, four cards are dealt face-up, one onto each tableau pile, and two more cards are dealt face-down on the reserve to be used later. After each deal of six cards, the player pauses to see if any cards are playable. Available for play to the foundations (which are above the four tableau piles) are the top cards of each tableau pile.

As they become available, one ace and one king of each suit are placed in the foundations. The aces are built up to kings while the kings are built down to aces, all by suit. Furthermore, once a foundation card is set, any can be built upon it at any time.

Once the player builds the necessary cards one could, another set of six is dealt: one on each of the four tableau piles and two face-down ones set aside on the reserve. Afterwards, the player builds more cards and the process is repeated until the stock runs out. Once this occurs, the entire reserve is turned face-up. All cards in that reserve become available to be built on the foundations, along with the top cards of each reserve pile.

When play goes on a stand still (when the tableau and the reserve no longer yields playable cards), the player is then entitled to three redeals. To do a redeal, the player picks up first tableau pile and places it over the second pile, picks up that newly formed pile and puts in over the third pile, and these three piles are then laid over the fourth pile. Then, the piles are turned face-down to form the new stock, and the remaining reserve piles are placed under it. On the first two redeals, the process of dealing one card on each of the four tableau piles and two more on the reserve faced down, stopping each time to make any play, and using the reserve when the stock runs out is repeated. But on the last redeal, there is no more reserve; all cards are dealt four at a time, one on each tableau pile.

The game ends soon after the stock runs out in the last redeal. The game is won when all cards end up in the foundations.

Parisienne
Parisienne (also known as La Parisienne or Parisian) is a variant of Grand Duchess. The game is played like Grand Duchess except the before the game starts, one ace and one king of each suit is removed from the deck and placed on the foundations.

References

See also
  Sir Tommy
 List of solitaires
 Glossary of solitaire

Double-deck patience card games
Reserved builders